Edward E. Baptist (born 1970) is an American academic and writer. He is a professor of history at Cornell University, located in Ithaca, New York, where he specializes in the history of the 19th-century United States, particularly the South. Thematically, he has been interested in the history of capitalism and has also been interested in digital humanities methodologies. He is the author of numerous books.

Early life and education 
Baptist was born in 1970 in Cambridge, Massachusetts, but he grew up in Durham, North Carolina. He graduated from Georgetown University and in 1997 earned his doctorate from University of Pennsylvania, Philadelphia.

Career 
Baptist is a professor of history at Cornell University. His areas of interest are 19th-century United States and especially the history of enslavement in America. Baptist is the author of many articles and books including The Half Has Never Been Told: Slavery and the Making of American Capitalism and the award-winning Creating an Old South.

In September 2014, Baptist's work came to prominence when The Economist published a review of The Half Has Never Been Told, criticizing Baptist's thesis that growth in cotton productivity was driven primarily by increasing cruelty. The review sparked widespread outrage for its statement, "Almost all the blacks in his book are victims, almost all the whites villains. This is not history; it is advocacy." This prompted a rare withdrawal of the article and an apology from the magazine. Baptist wrote a response in Politico magazine in which he states, Had the Economist actually engaged the book's arguments, the reviewer would have had to confront the scary fact that the unrestrained domination of market forces can sometimes amplify existing forms of oppression into something more horrific. No wonder the Economist abandoned its long-standing intellectual commitments in favor of sloppy old paternalism on Sept. 4, because if it hadn't, Mr./Ms. Anonymous might have had to admit that market fundamentalism doesn't always provide the best solution for every economic or social problem.

The Half Has Never Been Told received mixed reviews from academics. A number of historians, including Eric Foner of Columbia University and Daina Ramey Berry of the University of Texas at Austin, have praised the book.

Economic historians have sharply criticized The Half Has Never Been Told. Reviewing the book in The Journal of Economic History (JEH), Alan Olmstead writes, "Edward Baptist’s study of capitalism and slavery is flawed beyond repair." Olmstead criticizes Baptist's "torture hypothesis" that increasing cruelty drove increases in cotton picking output, citing research that finds that increases in productivity resulted primarily from planting of improved cotton varieties. Olmstead additionally writes that "carelessness with numbers when coupled with his fundamental misunderstanding of economic logic" leads Baptist to vastly overstate the importance of cotton to the antebellum American economy. In a separate review of the book in the JEH, Eric Hilt writes, "much of its economic analysis is so flawed that it undermines the credibility of the book." Hilt argues that Baptist's calculation of the share of cotton in antebellum America's Gross Domestic Product "is a disastrously mishandled undertaking, full of obvious manipulations that overstate cotton's contribution." A 2020 study in the Economic History Review rejects Baptist's thesis that slavery was necessary for American economic development.

In 2017, Baptist was awarded a prestigious Guggenheim Fellowship for a new project on the history of the policing of African Americans from Jamestown to Ferguson.

Personal life 
Baptist lives in Ithaca, New York.

Bibliography 
 (2002). Creating an Old South: Middle Florida's Plantation Frontier before the Civil War. University of North Carolina Press. .
 (2006). New Studies in the History of American Slavery. University of Georgia Press. 
 (2014). American Capitalism: A Reader. Louis Hyman and Edward E. Baptist. Simon & Schuster.
 (2014). The Half Has Never Been Told: Slavery and the Making of American Capitalism. Basic Books.

See also 

 List of Cornell University people
 List of Georgetown University alumni
 List of historians
 List of people from North Carolina
 List of University of Pennsylvania people

References

External links 
 
How slavery became America’s first big business. Vox interview, August 2019

1970 births
21st-century American male writers
21st-century American historians
Cornell University Department of History faculty
Georgetown University alumni
Historians of slavery
Historians of the United States
Writers from Cambridge, Massachusetts
Writers from Durham, North Carolina
University of Pennsylvania alumni
Writers from New York (state)
Living people
American male non-fiction writers
Historians from Massachusetts